The 1520s decade ran from January 1, 1520, to December 31, 1529.

References